The 1927 Turkish Football Championship was the second edition of the competition. It was held in September. All matches were played at İstiklal Sahası in the capital Ankara. Muhafızgücü won their first and only championship title by defeating Altınordu 5–1 in the final. For Altınordu it was the first appearance in the final of the championship, with two more to follow in 1932 and 1935. Şekip Bey of Muhafızgücü, who scored three goals in the second half of the final, became the first player in Turkish football history to score a hat-trick in a national competition.

The champions of the various regional championships qualified for the competition played in knock-out format.

Qualified clubs

 The participants of the Karesi (Balıkesir) and Trabzon regions are currently not available.

Preliminary round

First round

 1 The match could not be finished due to darkness. The remaining time was played on 5 September.

Resumed match

Quarter-finals

Playoff

 A playoff was held since a winner could not be decided in the first game.

Semi-finals

Third place match

Final

References

External links
RSSSF

Turkish Football Championship seasons
Turkish
Turkey